Stephen Robert Daley (born 15 April 1977) is an Australian scientific researcher and a former veterinarian and first-class cricketer.

Daley was born at Atherton in the Atherton Tableands region of Queensland in April 1977 and was raised nearby at Millaa Millaa. He later studied veterinary science at the University of Queensland, spending a year after graduating as a practicing vet in rural Beaudesert. In 2001, he decided to take up a research project as a Rhodes Scholar at Magdalen College at the University of Oxford in England, aimed at developing improved methods for organ transplantation in humans. While studying at Oxford, he made two appearances in first-class cricket for Oxford University in The University Matches of 2003 and 2005 against Cambridge University. He scored 12 runs in these matches, while with his right-arm medium-fast bowling he bowled nine wicketless overs, conceding 31 runs.

After graduating with a DPhil from Oxford, Daley has been a research fellow at the Australian National University.

Daley is now a Senior Lecturer and leads the Developmental Immunology Group at the Queensland University of Technology

References

External links

1977 births
Living people
People from Atherton, Queensland
University of Queensland alumni
Australian veterinarians
Male veterinarians
Australian Rhodes Scholars
Alumni of Magdalen College, Oxford
Australian cricketers
Oxford University cricketers
Academic staff of the Australian National University